Charles Ansell (born 1752), flourished towards the close of the 18th century was an English painter.

Work 
His name occurred only twice (1780 & 1781) in the catalogues of the Royal Academy. He was celebrated for his drawings of the horse, but also drew domestic subjects. His most celebrated work, Life and death of a Racehorse was engraved in a set of six plates by Francis Jukes, and published in 1784 by John Walker Carver & Printseller.

Other works were The graces of archery or elegant airs, attitudes and lady traps and a six plate set The life of a horse. Other works engraved by Peltro William Tomkins were The English Dressing Room, The English Fire Side, The French Dressing Room' and 'The French Fire Side.

References

Attribution:
 

1752 births
Year of death unknown
18th-century English painters
English male painters
Equine artists
18th-century English male artists